James Murdoch (4 July 1851 – 29 May 1925) was an Australian politician.

He was born in Hobart. In 1903 he was elected to the Tasmanian Legislative Council as the independent member for Pembroke. He served until his death in Cambridge in 1925, when he was succeeded by his son James. Another son, John, would also later represent the seat.

References

1851 births
1925 deaths
Independent members of the Parliament of Tasmania
Members of the Tasmanian Legislative Council